Development and Change is a bimonthly peer-reviewed academic journal published by Wiley-Blackwell on behalf of the Institute of Social Studies. The journal was established in 1970 and covers development studies and social change. Specific topics of interest are international agencies, macroanalysis, non-governmental organizations, public policy, social structure, and sustainability.  According to the Journal Citation Reports, the journal has a 2011 impact factor of 1.411, ranking it 15th out of 54 journals in the category "Planning and Development".

References

External links 
 

Wiley-Blackwell academic journals
English-language journals
Publications established in 1970
Sociology journals
Bimonthly journals
Development studies journals
Globalization-related journals